Sandy Valley is an unincorporated community in the Mesquite Valley in west–central Clark County, Nevada, United States. Sandy Valley has a variant name of Sandy, Nevada.  The population was 2,051 at the 2010 census. Sandy Valley is bordered on the East by the southern extension of the Spring Mountains and on the west by the California state line. Sandy Valley began in the 19th century as the five mining communities of Kingston, Sandy, Ripley, Mesquite and Platina. It is approximately forty-five miles from Las Vegas.

Sky Ranch Estates Airport (FAA Identifier: 3L2), is the local general aviation field.

Geography
Sandy Valley is located at  (35.828999, -115.651943).

Demographics

As of the census of 2010, there were 2,051 people and 1,024 households in the census-designated place (CDP) of Sandy Valley. There were 811 housing units at an average density of 14.5 per square mile (5.6/km2). The racial makeup of the CDP was 92.57% White, 1.39% African American, 0.61% Native American, 0.72% Asian, 0.06% Pacific Islander, 2.72% from other races, and 1.94% from two or more races. Hispanic or Latino of any race were 6.49% of the population.

There were 714 households, out of which 26.2% had children under the age of 18 living with them, 54.1% were married couples living together, 7.3% had a female householder with no husband present, and 33.2% were non-families. 23.8% of all households were made up of individuals, and 7.8% had someone living alone who was 65 years of age or older. The average household size was 2.53 and the average family size was 3.03.

In the CDP, the population was spread out, with 25.1% under the age of 18, 4.0% from 18 to 24, 25.3% from 25 to 44, 33.8% from 45 to 64, and 11.9% who were 65 years of age or older. The median age was 43 years. For every 100 females, there were 101.3 males. For every 100 females age 18 and over, there were 106.4 males.

The median income for a household in the CDP was $43,663, and the median income for a family was $46,389. Males had a median income of $37,000 versus $26,074 for females. The per capita income for the CDP was $17,439. About 9.0% of families and 14.9% of the population were below the poverty line, including 22.7% of those under age 18 and 8.7% of those age 65 or over.

In 2007, Clark County estimated the population at 2,099  up from 1,974 in 2006.

Education
Public education in Sandy Valley is administered by the Clark County School District. The district operates Sandy Valley School (K-12).

Sandy Valley has a public library, a branch of the Las Vegas-Clark County Library District.

Notable people
 Bo Gritz, former U.S. Army soldier and political activist, lives in Sandy Valley

References

External links

 Sandy Valley Citizens Advisory Council Meeting Agendas and Minutes

Census-designated places in Clark County, Nevada
Populated places in the Mojave Desert